CMC International was an American independent record label founded by Bill Cain and Tom Lipsky in 1991, focused mainly on classic rock, and classic heavy metal. The label was the haven of many hard rock, arena rock, thrash metal, glam metal, and AOR artists in the period when all the majors were investing all their financial efforts on grunge and alternative rock acts. In 1995 CMC started a partnership with BMG Entertainment, which in 1999 owned the majority of the company, with founder Tom Lipsky holding a minority stake.

CMC International became a division of Sanctuary Records Group in 2000, with Lipsky becoming president of Sanctuary Records North America. After Universal Music Group acquired Sanctuary in 2007, CMC International ceased to exist. However, due to conditions imposed by the European Commission following UMG's 2012 acquisition of EMI, it sold Sanctuary to BMG Rights Management in 2013 for over €46 million ($71.875 million). Since then, Sanctuary has been distributed globally by Warner Music Group through its ADA division.

Tom Lipsky is currently working as president of Roadrunner Records' Loud & Proud division, managing classic rock bands and artists.

Notable former artists
Accept
Annihilator
Pat Benatar
Blackthorn
Bruce Dickinson
Blue Öyster Cult
Christopher Cross
Deep Purple
Dokken
Eddie Money
The Fixx
Iron Maiden
Joe Cocker
Judas Priest
Kix
L.A. Guns
Alexi Lalas
La Toya Jackson
Loverboy
Lynch Mob
Lynyrd Skynyrd
Yngwie J. Malmsteen
Molly Hatchet
Motörhead
Night Ranger
Overkill
Saigon Kick
Saxon
Slaughter
Soulmotor
Styx
38 Special
Thin Lizzy
Tyketto
Vixen (band)
Warrant
Widowmaker (Dee Snider band)
W.A.S.P.
Yes

See also
WARHEAD "Tonight We Rock EP.  002 Release for CMC

References

American independent record labels
Heavy metal record labels
Rock record labels
Record labels established in 1991
Record labels disestablished in 2000
Defunct record labels of the United States
1991 establishments in North Carolina